The Under Secretary for Political Affairs is currently the fourth-ranking position in the United States Department of State, after the secretary, the deputy secretary, and the deputy secretary of state for management and resources. The current under secretary is Victoria Nuland, who was confirmed by the Senate on April 29, 2021, and began work on May 3, 2021.

The Under Secretary of State for Political Affairs is a career Foreign Service officer. This makes the officeholder the highest-ranking member of the United States Foreign Service. The under secretary serves as the day-to-day manager of overall regional and bilateral policy issues, and oversees the bureaus for Africa, East Asia and the Pacific, Europe and Eurasia, the Near East, South and Central Asia, the Western Hemisphere, and International Organizations. The Under Secretary is advised by Assistant Secretaries of the geographic bureaus, who guide U.S. diplomatic missions within their regional jurisdiction.

The political bureaus were first overseen in 1949 by a deputy under secretary for political affairs. Prior to the creation of the position of under secretary of state for political affairs in August 1959, the deputy under secretary for political affairs assisted the secretary and under secretary of state in the formulation and conduct of U.S. foreign policy. After August 1959, the deputy under secretary of political affairs served as a focal point for interdepartmental relations, especially those dealing with politico-military issues. During 1969, the department discontinued the position and created a new Bureau for Politico-Military Affairs, which exists today as the Bureau of Political-Military Affairs under another under secretary.

List of Under Secretaries for Political Affairs

References

 
1959 introductions
United States diplomacy